The Karpatendeutsche Landsmannschaft Slowakei is an organization of German refugees expelled from their homes in Slovakia after World War II. The organization is based in Stuttgart, and it was founded in 1949.

See also 
Expulsion of Germans after World War II
Federation of Expellees
Flight and expulsion of Germans (1944–1950)

External links 
Official website

Landsmannschaften